Events in the year 2022 in South Ossetia.

Incumbents 

 President: Anatoly Bibilov (until 24 May); Alan Gagloyev onwards
 Prime Minister: Gennady Bekoyev (until 20 June); Konstantin Dzhussoev onwards

Events 

 30 March – The President of South Ossetia, Anatoly Bibilov, declares that the partially recognised state will undertake "legal steps" in the near future for accession to become part of Russia. 
 30 March – On a televised address, President Anatoly Bibilov declared that he would take legal steps towards a referendum on the territory joining the Russian Federation.
 31 March – Georgia says plans by the breakaway state of South Ossetia, which is internationally recognized as occupied Georgian territory, to hold a referendum on becoming a part of Russia are "unacceptable".
 10 April – First round of the 2022 South Ossetian presidential election. 
 8 May – Second round of the 2022 South Ossetian presidential election
 24 May – Alan Gagloyev is elected President.
 30 May – President Alan Gagloyev declares plans to hold a referendum on joining Russia have been suspended.

References 

 
2010s in South Ossetia
Years of the 21st century in South Ossetia
South Ossetia
South Ossetia